Hovet is a village in Valle municipality in Agder county, Norway. There is a bridge over the river Otra at Hovet which connects to the Norwegian National Road 9 highway which runs along the west side of the highway.

References

Villages in Agder
Valle, Norway